Moorman or Moormann may refer to:

 Moorman, Kentucky, a census-designated place (CDP) in Muhlenberg County, United States
 Bernard H. Moormann House, a historic residence in eastern Cincinnati, Ohio, United States
 a Sri Lankan Moor

People

Moorman
 Brian Moorman (born 1976), American football player
 Charlotte Moorman (1933–1991), American cellist and performance artist
 Charles Moorman (born 1953), American businessman
 Chris Moorman (born 1985), British professional poker player
 John Moorman (1905–1989), English bishop and ecumenist
 Joyce Solomon Moorman (born 1946), American composer and educator
 Mary Moorman (born 1932), witness to the assassination of U.S. President John F. Kennedy
 Mo Moorman (born 1945), American football player

Moormann
 Rainer Moormann (born 1950), German chemist and nuclear whistleblower
 Sarah Moormann Scharper (1920-1992), actress, director, teacher, writer and lecturer
 Paul Schmitz-Moormann (known as Kid Paul; born 1975), German DJ, and acid house and trance musician

See also 
 Moerman (disambiguation)
 Morman (died 818), Breton chieftain
 Mormon (disambiguation)
 Murman (disambiguation)